Jaci Antonio Louzada Tupi Caldas (Also signed: Jacy Antonio Louzada Tupy Caldas, but was best known as Tupi Caldas.) (19 July 1898 – 1946) was a Brazilian paleontologist. He gave contributions to paleontology describing some of the animals found in the region Paleorrota.

Biography 

He lived in Porto Alegre, was professor of military school and a member of the Historical and Geographical Institute of Rio Grande do Sul, formed in Pharmacy - in 1917 the Faculty of Medicine of Porto Alegre. In paleontology helped describe Dinodontosaurus pedroanum and Hyperodapedon mariensis.

References 

 Book Os Fascinantes Caminhos da Paleontologia. Author : Antônio Isaia. Publisher Pallotti. (Portuguese)
 Book: "Cronologia Histórica de Santa Maria e do extinto município de São Martinho." 1787–1933. Vol I. Author: Romeu Beltrão, Publisher Pallotti, 1958. (Portuguese)

1898 births
1946 deaths
Brazilian paleontologists